Xylographella is a genus of tree-fungus beetles in the family Ciidae.

Species
 Xylographella punctata Miyatake, 1985

References

Ciidae genera